Kalā means performing art in Sanskrit. In Hindu scripture, Shiva is the master of Kalā. In the Lalita Sahasranama, the Devi is invoked as an embodiment of the 64 fine arts.

64 Arts 
The mastery of over 64 kinds of skills is called chatushashti Kalas. They are:
 
 Geeta vidya: singing.
 Vadya vidya: playing on musical instruments.
 Nritya vidya: dancing.
 Natya vidya: theatricals.
 alekhya vidya: painting.
 viseshakacchedya vidya: painting the face and body with color
 tandula-kusuma-bali-vikara: preparing offerings from rice and flowers.
 pushpastarana: making a covering of flowers for a bed.
 dasana-vasananga-raga: applying preparations for cleansing the teeth, cloths and painting the body.
 mani-bhumika-karma: making the groundwork of jewels.
 sayya-racana: covering the bed.
 udaka vadya: playing on music in water.
 udaka-ghata: splashing with water.
 citra-yoga: practically applying an admixture of colors.
 malya-grathana-vikalpa: designing a preparation of wreaths.
 sekharapida-yojana: practically setting the coronet on the head.
 nepathya-yoga: practically dressing in the tiring room.
 karnapatra-bhanga: decorating the tragus of the ear.
 sugandha-yukti: practical application of aromatics.
 bhushana-yojana: applying or setting ornaments.
 aindra-jala: juggling.
 kaucumara: a kind of art.
 hasta-laghava: sleight of hand.
 citra-sakapupa-bhakshya-vikara-kriya: preparing varieties of  delicious food.
 panaka-rasa-ragasava-yojana: practically preparing palatable drinks and tinging draughts with red color.
 suci-vaya-karma: needleworks and weaving.
 sutra-krida: playing with thread.
 vina-damuraka-vadya: playing on vina- a stringed instrument and small two headed drum.
 prahelika: making and solving riddles.
 durvacaka-yoga: practicing language difficult to be answered by others.
 pustaka-vacana: reciting books.
 natikakhyayika-darsana: enacting short plays and anecdotes.
 kavya-samasya-purana: solving enigmatic verses.
 pattika-vetra-bana-vikalpa: designing preparation of shield, cane and arrows.
 tarku-karma: spinning by spindle.
 takshana: carpentry.
 vastu-vidya: Architecture.
 raupya-ratna-pariksha: testing silver and jewels.
 dhatu-vada: metallurgy.
 mani-raga jnana: tinging jewels.
 akara jnana: mineralogy.
 vrikshayur-veda-yoga: practicing medicine or medical treatment, by herbs.
 mesha-kukkuta-lavaka-yuddha-vidhi: knowing the mode of fighting of lambs, cocks and birds.
 suka-sarika-prapalana (pralapana): maintaining or knowing conversation between male and female cockatoos.
 utsadana: healing or cleaning a person with perfumes.
 kesa-marjana-kausala: combing hair.
 akshara-mushtika-kathana: talking with fingers.
 dharana-matrika: the use of amulets.
 desa-bhasha-jnana: knowing provincial dialects.
 nirmiti-jnana: knowing predictions by heavenly voice
 yantra-matrika: mechanics.
 mlecchita-kutarka-vikalpa: fabricating barbarous or foreign sophistry.
 samvacya: conversation.
 manasi kavya-kriya: flyting.
 kriya-vikalpa: designing a literary work or a medical remedy.
 chalitaka-yoga: practicing as a builder of shrines called after him.
 abhidhana-kosha-cchando-jnana: the use of lexicography and meters.
 vastra-gopana: concealment of cloths.
 dyuta-visesha: knowing specific gambling.
 akarsha-krida: playing with dice or magnet.
 balaka-kridanaka: using children's toys.
 vainayiki vidya: enforcing discipline.
 vaijayiki vidya: gaining victory.
 vaitaliki vidya: awakening master with music at dawn.

See also
 Hindu art

References

External links

Krishna